Pycnopsyche is a genus of northern caddisflies in the family Limnephilidae. There are about 17 described species in Pycnopsyche.

ITIS Taxonomic note:
Type species: Limnephila scabripennis P Rambur (original designation).

Species
 Pycnopsyche aglona Ross, 1941
 Pycnopsyche antica (Walker, 1852)
 Pycnopsyche circularis (Provancher, 1877)
 Pycnopsyche conspersa Banks, 1943
 Pycnopsyche divergens (Walker, 1852)
 Pycnopsyche flavata (Banks, 1914)
 Pycnopsyche gentilis (McLachlan, 1871) (caddisfly)
 Pycnopsyche guttifera (Walker, 1852)
 Pycnopsyche indiana (Ross, 1938)
 Pycnopsyche lepida (Hagen, 1861)
 Pycnopsyche limbata (McLachlan, 1871)
 Pycnopsyche luculenta (Betten, 1934)
 Pycnopsyche rossi Betten, 1950
 Pycnopsyche scabripennis (Rambur, 1842) (giant red sedge)
 Pycnopsyche sonso (Milne, 1935)
 Pycnopsyche subfasciata (Say, 1828)
 Pycnopsyche virginica (Banks, 1900)

References

Further reading

 
 
 
 

Trichoptera genera
Integripalpia